Eeden (often as Van Eeden/van Eeden, or Von Eeden/von Eeden) is a Germanic surname. It may refer to:

Chris van Eeden (born 1956), West German sprint canoer
Constance van Eeden (1927–2021), Dutch/Canadian statistician
Fleur van Eeden (born 1983/1984), South African stunt performer
Frederik van Eeden (1860–1932), Dutch writer and psychiatrist
Marcel van Eeden (born 1965), Dutch draftsman and painter
Marguerite van Eeden, South African actress and photographer
Trevor Von Eeden (born ?), American comic book artist and writer

See also
Van Eeden v Minister of Safety and Security, 2002 South African lawsuit regarding State liability involving prison escapees